Jerzy Kazimierz Baksalary (25 June 1944–8 March 2005) was a Polish mathematician who specialized in mathematical statistics and linear algebra. In 1990 he was appointed professor of mathematical sciences. He authored over 170 academic papers published and won one of the Ministry of National Education awards.

He was a graduate of the Faculty of Mathematics, Physics and Chemistry at the University of Adam Mickiewicz in Poznan (1969). In the years 1969-1988 he was associated with the Department of Mathematics of the University of Agriculture in Poznań. 
From 1996, he was the dean of the Faculty of Mathematics, Physics and Technology at the Military University of WSP, and after the WSP joined the Zielona Góra University of Technology and the emergence of the University of Zielona Góra, he headed the Linear Algebra and Mathematical Statistics group.

References

1944 births
2005 deaths
Polish mathematicians
Adam Mickiewicz University in Poznań alumni
Academic staff of the University of Zielona Góra